Urban warfare is combat conducted in urban areas such as towns and cities. Urban combat differs from combat in the open at both the operational and the tactical levels. Complicating factors in urban warfare include the presence of civilians and the complexity of the urban terrain. Urban combat operations may be conducted to capitalize on strategic or tactical advantages associated with the possession or the control of a particular urban area or to deny these advantages to the enemy.

Fighting in urban areas negates the advantages that one side may have over the other in armor, heavy artillery, or air support. Ambushes laid down by small groups of soldiers with handheld anti-tank weapons can destroy entire columns of modern armor (as in the First Battle of Grozny), while artillery and air support can be severely reduced if the "superior" party wants to limit civilian casualties as much as possible, but the defending party does not (or even uses civilians as human shields).

Some civilians may be difficult to distinguish from such combatants as armed militias and gangs, and particularly individuals who are simply trying to protect their homes from attackers. Tactics are complicated by a three-dimensional environment, limited fields of view and fire because of buildings, enhanced concealment and cover for defenders, below-ground infrastructure, and the ease of placement of booby traps and snipers.

Military terminology

Historically, the United States Armed Forces has referred to urban warfare as UO (urban operations), but this term has been largely replaced with MOUT (military operations in urban terrain).

The British armed forces terms are OBUA (operations in built-up areas), FIBUA (fighting in built-up areas), or sometimes (colloquially) FISH (fighting in someone's house), or FISH and CHIPS (fighting in someone's house and causing havoc in people's streets).

The term FOFO (fighting in fortified objectives) refers to clearing enemy personnel from narrow and entrenched places like bunkers, trenches and strongholds; the dismantling of mines and wires; and the securing of footholds in enemy areas.

Israel Defense Forces calls urban warfare לש"ב (pronounced LASHAB), a Hebrew acronym for warfare on urban terrain. LASHAB in the IDF includes large-scale tactics (such as utilization of heavy armoured personnel carriers, armoured bulldozers, UAVs for intelligence, etc.), CQB training for fighting forces (how a small team of infantry soldiers should fight in close and built-up spaces). IDF's LASHAB was developed mainly in recent decades, after the 1982 Lebanon War included urban warfare in Beirut and Lebanese villages, and was further developed during the Second Intifada (2000–2005) in which IDF soldiers entered and fought in Palestinian cities, villages and refugee camps. The IDF has a special large and advanced facility for training soldiers and units in urban warfare.

Urban operations 

Urban military operations in World War II often relied on large quantities of artillery bombardment and air support varying from ground attack fighters to heavy bombers. In some particularly vicious urban warfare operations such as Stalingrad and Warsaw, all weapons were used irrespective of their consequences. 

However, when liberating occupied territory some restraint was often applied, particularly in urban settings. For example, Canadian operations in both Ortona and Groningen avoided the use of artillery altogether to spare civilians and buildings, and during the Battle of Manila in 1945, General MacArthur initially placed a ban on artillery and air strikes to save civilian lives.

Military forces are bound by the laws of war governing military necessity to the amount of force which can be applied when attacking an area where there are known to be civilians. Until the 1970s, this was covered by the 1907 Hague Convention IV – The Laws and Customs of War on Land which specifically includes articles 25–27. This has since been supplemented by the Additional Protocols to the Geneva Conventions of 12 August 1949, and relating to the Protection of Victims of International and Non-International Armed Conflicts.

Sometimes distinction and proportionality, as in the case of the Canadians in Ortona, causes the attacking force to restrain from using all the force they could when attacking a city. In other cases, such as the Battle of Stalingrad and the Battle of Berlin, both military forces considered evacuating civilians only to find it impractical.

When Russian forces attacked Grozny in 1999, large amounts of artillery fire were used. The Russian Army handled the issue of civilian casualties by warning the inhabitants that they were going to launch an all-out assault on Grozny and requested that all civilians leave the city before the start of the artillery bombardment.

Fighting in an urban environment can offer some advantages to a weaker defending force or to guerrilla fighters through ambush-induced attrition losses. The attacking army must account for three dimensions more often, and consequently expend greater amounts of manpower in order to secure a myriad of structures, and mountains of rubble.

Ferroconcrete structures will be ruined by heavy bombardment, but it is very difficult to demolish such a building totally when it is well defended. Soviet forces had to fight room by room while defending the Red October Steel Factory during the Battle of Stalingrad, and in 1945, during the race to capture the Reichstag, despite heavy bombardment with artillery at point blank range (including 203 mm howitzers).

It is also difficult to destroy underground or heavily fortified structures such as bunkers and utility tunnels; during the Battle of Budapest in 1944 fighting broke out in the sewers, as both Axis and Soviet troops used them for troop movements.

Urban warfare tactics

The characteristics of an average city include tall buildings, narrow alleys, sewage tunnels and possibly a subway system. Defenders may have the advantage of detailed local knowledge of the area, right down to the layout inside of buildings and means of travel not shown on maps. 

The buildings can provide excellent sniping posts while alleys and rubble-filled streets are ideal for planting booby traps. Defenders can move from one part of the city to another undetected using tunnels and spring ambushes. 

Meanwhile, the attackers tend to become more exposed than the defender as they must use the open streets more often, unfamiliar with the defenders' secret and hidden routes. During a house to house search the attacker is often also exposed on the streets.

Battle of Monterrey, Mexico

The Battle of Monterrey was the US Army's first major encounter with urban warfare. It occurred in September 1846 when the US Army under Zachary Taylor invaded the town. The US Army had no prior training in urban warfare and the Mexican defenders hid on rooftops, shot through loopholes, and stationed cannons in the middle of the city's streets. The houses at Monterrey were made of thick adobe, with strong double doors and few windows. The rooftops were lined with a two-foot-tall wall that acted as a parapet for the defending soldiers. Each home was a fort unto itself. 

On September 21, 1846, the US Army which included some of its best soldiers, recent West Point graduates, marched down the city's streets and were cut down by the Mexican defenders. They could not see the men hidden behind walls, loopholes, or rooftops. They tried to march straight down the street until the intense fire drove them to hide in adjacent buildings. Taylor tried to move artillery into the city but it could not hit the well-hidden defenders any better than the US soldiers could. Two days later the US again assaulted the city from two sides and this time they fought differently.

Not wanting to repeat the mistakes of the 21st, General William Jenkins Worth listened to his Texan advisers. These men had fought in Mexican cities before at the Battle of Mier in 1842 and the Battle of Bexar in 1835. They understood that the army needed to "mouse hole" through each house and root out the defenders in close combat.

Worth's men used pick axes to chip holes in the adobe walls of the homes, in the roof of the house from where the soldiers could drop in, or used ladders to climb to the top of a rooftop and assault the Mexican defenders in hand-to-hand combat. The typical assault on a home would include one man who would run to the door of the house and chip the door away with a pick axe under covering fire. Once the door showed signs of weakening, 3–4 other soldiers would run to the door and barge in with revolvers blazing. Worth lost few men on the 23rd using these new urban warfare techniques.

Battle of Berlin

A Soviet combat group was a mixed arms unit of about eighty men, divided into assault groups of six to eight men, closely supported by field artillery. These were tactical units which were able to apply the tactics of house to house fighting that the Soviets had been forced to develop and refine at each Festungsstadt (fortress city) they had encountered from Stalingrad to Berlin.

The German tactics in the battle of Berlin were dictated by three considerations: the experience that the Germans had gained during five years of war; the physical characteristics of Berlin; and the tactics used by the Soviets.

Most of the central districts of Berlin consisted of city blocks with straight wide roads, intersected by several waterways, parks and large railway marshalling yards.

Much of the housing stock consisted of apartment blocks built in the second half of the 19th century. Most of those, thanks to housing regulations and few elevators, were five stories high, built around a courtyard which could be reached from the street through a corridor large enough to take a horse and cart or small trucks used to deliver coal. In many places these apartment blocks were built around several courtyards, one behind the other, each one reached through the outer courtyards by a ground-level tunnel similar to that between the first courtyard and the road. The larger, more expensive flats faced the street and the smaller, less expensive ones were found around the inner courtyards.

Just as the Soviets had learned a lot about urban warfare, so had the Germans. The Waffen-SS did not use the makeshift barricades erected close to street corners, because these could be raked by artillery fire from guns firing over open sights further along the straight streets. Instead, they put snipers and machine guns on the upper floors and the roofs – a safer deployment as the Soviet tanks could not elevate their guns that high. They also put men armed with panzerfausts in cellar windows to ambush tanks as they moved down the streets. These tactics were quickly adopted by the Hitler Youth and the First World War Volkssturm veterans.

To counter these tactics, Soviet submachine gunners rode the tanks and sprayed every doorway and window, but this meant the tank could not traverse its turret quickly. The other solution was to rely on heavy howitzers (152 mm and 203 mm) firing over open sights to blast defended buildings and to use anti-aircraft guns against defenders posted on the higher floors.

Soviet combat groups started to move from house to house instead of directly down the streets. They moved through the apartments and cellars blasting holes through the walls of adjacent buildings (for which the Soviets found abandoned German panzerfausts were very effective), while others fought across the roof tops and through the attics.

These tactics took the Germans lying in ambush for tanks in the flanks. Flamethrowers and grenades were very effective, but as the Berlin civilian population had not been evacuated these tactics inevitably killed many civilians.

First Chechen War

During the First Chechen War most of the Chechen fighters had been trained in the Soviet armed forces. They were divided into combat groups consisting of 15 to 20 personnel, subdivided into three or four-man fire teams. A fire team consisted of an antitank gunner, usually armed with a Russian made RPG-7s or RPG-18s, a machine gunner and a sniper. The team would be supported by ammunition runners and assistant gunners. To destroy Russian armoured vehicles in Grozny, five or six hunter-killer fire teams deployed at ground level, in second and third stories, and in basements. The snipers and machine gunners would pin down the supporting infantry while the antitank gunners would engage the armoured vehicle aiming at the top, rear and sides of vehicles.

Initially, the Russians were taken by surprise. Their armoured columns that were supposed to take the city without difficulty as Soviet forces had taken Budapest in 1956 were decimated in fighting more reminiscent of the Battle of Budapest in late 1944. As in the Soviet assault on Berlin, as a short term measure, they deployed  self-propelled anti-aircraft guns (ZSU-23-4 and 2K22M) to engage the Chechen combat groups, as their tank's main gun did not have the elevation and depression to engage the fire teams and an armoured vehicle's machine gun could not suppress the fire of half a dozen different fire teams simultaneously.

In the long term, the Russians brought in more infantry and began a systematic advance through the city, house by house and block by block, with dismounted Russian infantry moving in support of armour. In proactive moves, the Russians started to set up ambush points of their own and then move armour towards them to lure the Chechen combat groups into ambushes.

As with the Soviet tank crews in Berlin in 1945, who attached bedsprings to the outside of their turrets to reduce the damage done by German panzerfausts, some of the Russian armour was fitted quickly with a cage of wire mesh mounted some 25–30 centimetres away from the hull armour to defeat the shaped charges of the Chechen RPGs.

Operation Defensive Shield 

Operation Defensive Shield was a counter-terrorism military operation conducted by the Israel Defense Forces in April 2002 as a response to a wave of suicide bombings by Palestinian factions which claimed the lives of hundreds of Israeli civilians.

The two major battles were held in Nablus and Jenin.

In Nablus, the Paratroopers Brigade and the Golani Brigade, backed by reservist armour force and combat engineers with armoured Caterpillar D9 bulldozers, entered to Nablus, killing 70 militants and arresting hundreds, while sustaining only one fatality. The forces deployed many small teams, advancing in non-linear manner from many directions, utilising snipers and air support. The battle ended quickly with a decisive Israeli victory.

In Jenin the battle was much harder and fierce. Unlike in Nablus, the forces who fought in Jenin were mainly reserve forces. The Palestinian militants booby-trapped the city and the refugee camp with thousands of explosive charges, some were very large and most were concealed in houses and on the streets.  After 13 Israeli soldiers were killed in an ambush combined with booby traps, snipers and suicide bombers, the IDF changed its tactics from slow advancing infantry soldiers backed by attack helicopters to a heavy use of armoured bulldozers. The heavily armoured bulldozers began by clearing booby traps and ended with razing many houses, mainly in the center of the refugee camp. The armoured bulldozers were unstoppable and impervious to Palestinian attacks and by razing booby-trapped houses and buildings which used as gun posts they forced the militants in Jenin to surrender. In total, 56 Palestinians and 23 Israeli soldiers were killed in the battle of Jenin.

In total, Operation Defensive Shield was considered an Israeli victory and a turning-point in the Second Intifada. Although the suicide bombings did not stop completely, their number decreased sharply. Israel continued in daily military raids onto Palestinian cities and towns to arrest militants and destroy terror facilities.

Close-quarters battle

The term close-quarter battle refers to fighting methods within buildings, streets, narrow alleys and other places where visibility and manoeuvrability are limited.

Both close-quarters-battle (CQB) and urban operations (UO) are related to urban warfare, but while UO refers mainly to the macromanagement factor (i.e. sending troops, using of heavy  armoured fighting vehicles, battle management), CQB refers to the micromanagement factor—namely: how a small squad of infantry troops should fight in urban environments and/or inside buildings in order to achieve its goals with minimal casualties.

As a doctrine, CQB concerns topics such as:
 Weapons and ammunition most suitable for the mission
 Extra gear, such as bulletproof vests and night vision devices
 Accurate explosives
 Routines and drills for engaging the enemy, securing a perimeter, clearing a room, etc.
 Team maneuvers
 Methods and tactics

Military CQB doctrine is different from police CQB doctrine, mainly because the military usually operates in hostile areas while the police operates within docile populations.

Armies that often engage in urban warfare operations may train most of their infantry in CQB doctrine. While training will vary, it generally will focus on what proficiencies each unit possess. This is in opposition to what units may lack in either strength or weapons capabilities.  
The fundamentals of muzzle awareness and weapons safety are of the utmost importance given the propensity for fratricide due to the confined spaces, as well as the limited avenues of approach.

Urban warfare training

Armed forces seek to train their units for those circumstances in which they are to fight: built up, urban areas are no exception. Several countries have created simulated urban training zones. The British Army has established an "Afghan village" within its Stanford Battle Area and the French Army has built several urban training areas in its CENZUB facility.

During World War II, as preparation for the Allied invasion of Normandy, the population of the English village of Imber was evacuated compulsorily to provide an urban training area for United States forces. The facility has been retained, despite efforts by the displaced people to recover their homes, and was used for British Army training for counter-insurgency operations in Northern Ireland. A newer purpose-built training area has been created at Copehill Down, some 3 miles from Imber.

See also

 Battleplan (documentary TV series)
 Civilian casualty ratio
 Military urbanism
 Mouse-holing
 Operation Urban Warrior
 Second Battle of Fallujah
 Siege warfare
 Urban guerrilla warfare
 Urban terrain

Notes

Citations

References

External links 

 Military Operations on Urbanized Terrain (MOUT), Marine Corps Warfighting Publication (MCWP) 3–35.3 – US Marine Corps guidance on urban warfare
 Small Wars Journal – Urban operations, reading guide.
 Urban warfare in Sub-Saharan Africa in 1970–1981: inventing the rules of the game.

 
Sniper warfare